Neal Allan Doughty (born July 29, 1946) is an American keyboardist, best known as a founding member of the rock band REO Speedwagon and the only member to have played on every album. He formed the band in the fall of 1966, with original drummer Alan Gratzer (who left REO in 1988).

Although he has never been one of REO Speedwagon's primary songwriters, Doughty has written or co-written several of the band's songs. Songs for which he is the sole composer include "Sky Blues" from 1974, "One Lonely Night" from 1984 and "Variety Tonight" from 1987. The latter two songs charted as Billboard singles, with "One Lonely Night" cracking the top 20.

His most notable playing includes the Hammond organ solo on "Roll with the Changes" and the honky-tonk piano work on "157 Riverside Avenue". He notes the piano track to "Can't Fight This Feeling" was his most difficult studio performance, but is now his favorite part of live concerts.

He was an early adopter of the Moog synthesizer, which can be heard on the opening swoop of "Ridin' the Storm Out". Currently, he is using synths made by Korg and Yamaha and tours with a Hammond B3 organ routed through Leslie speaker cabinets.

Doughty retired from touring with REO in January 2023, though remains an official member. He will still appear at select shows in the future.

References

External links 
 Official website
  REO Speedwagon official website

1946 births
Living people
American rock pianists
American organists
American rock keyboardists
Songwriters from Indiana
REO Speedwagon members
Musicians from Evansville, Indiana
Musicians from Indiana
21st-century American keyboardists
21st-century American pianists
21st-century organists
20th-century American keyboardists